Working Girls is a 2020 Belgian drama film directed by Frédéric Fonteyne and Anne Paulicevich. It was selected as the Belgian entry for the Best International Feature Film at the 93rd Academy Awards, but it was not nominated.

At the 11th Magritte Awards, Working Girls was nominated for three awards, including Best Film and Best Screenplay for Paulicevich.

Plot
Three prostitutes who work at the border between Belgium and France bury a body.

Cast
 Sara Forestier as Axelle
 Noémie Lvovsky as Dominique
 Annabelle Lengronne as Conso
 Nicolas Cazalé as Yann
 Jonas Bloquet as Jean-Fi
 Sergi López as Boris
 Gilles Remiche as Marc

See also
 List of submissions to the 93rd Academy Awards for Best International Feature Film
 List of Belgian submissions for the Academy Award for Best International Feature Film

References

External links
 

2020 films
2020 drama films
2020s French-language films
Belgian drama films
French-language Belgian films
Films directed by Frédéric Fonteyne